West Van Voorhis is an unincorporated community in Monongalia County, West Virginia, United States.

References

Unincorporated communities in Monongalia County, West Virginia
Unincorporated communities in West Virginia
West Virginia populated places on the Monongahela River